Om Shanti Om is an Indian Hindi musical television series which broadcasts on Star Bharat. It is a reality show focusing on devotional music to contemporary music for which they are judged. Baba Ramdev is the overhead judge, main judges are Sonakshi Sinha, Kanika Kapoor and Shekhar Ravjiani, and hosted by Aparshakti Khurana. It was conceptualised by Pankaj Narayan and Apoorva Bajaj of Ath Entertainment along with Colosceum Media. The show launched on 28 August 2017 at the same time as the TV station STAR Bharat.

Judges
Baba Ramdev
Sonakshi Sinha
Shekhar Ravjiani
Kanika Kapoor
Aparshakti Khurana Host

2017 Contestants
1) Rabjot Singh - 24 Years - Jammu
2) Riya Bhattacharya - 21 Years - jhartkhand -
3) Bhanu Pandit - 23 Years - Rudki
4) Arth kumar - 17 Years - Patna
5) Anita Bhatt - 25 Years - Nainital
6) Arfin Rana Mir - 24 Years - Kolkara 
7) Dipti Mishra - 24 Years - Lucknow 
8) Mukesh Pancholi - 35 Years - Madhya Pradesh
9) Aditya Bansal - 15 Years - Manali
10) Ananya chaudhary - 16 Years - Assam
11) Balraj Shastri - 23 Years - Ahmedabad
12) Zaid ali  -  10 Years - Uttar Pradesh - 4th Runner Up
13) Priya Malik - 17 Years - Patna 
14) Ritika Parmeshvar - 28 Years - Delhi

References 

Indian television series
2017 Indian television series debuts
Star Bharat original programming
Indian music television series
Indian reality television series